Lenta is a Russian super- and hypermarket chain. With 149 locations across the country, it is one of Russia's largest retail chains in addition to being the country's second largest hypermarket chain.

Founded by Oleg Zherebtsov, Lenta opened its first cash and carry store in St. Petersburg, Russia, in October 1993. Lenta then registered its trademark in 1994. And, by 1999, it opened its first big-box hypermarket format and has expanded ever since. The company operates five distribution centres for hypermarkets. The company's stores base themselves on price-led hypermarkets and supermarket scheme. Lenta employs around 35,100 people.

Lenta’s largest shareholders include TPG Capital, the European Bank for Reconstruction and Development and VTB Capital. Global Depository Receipts (GDRs) of Lenta Ltd. are listed on the London Stock Exchange and on the Moscow Exchange.

The parent company of the chain – Lenta LLC – 100% belongs to Lenta Ltd., that is registered in the British Virgin Islands. 41,3% of shares belong to investment – TPG Capital and «VTB Capital» (35,5% and 4% respectively), 15,3% belongs to EBRD, minor shareholders share the rest.  
CEO of the chain is Herman Tinga.

On 18 May 2021, Lenta announced the purchase of 161 supermarkets of the Austrian Billa supermarket chain. The transaction amount was 215 million euros.

In February 2022, Lenta acquired Utkonos online-retailer from its shareholder, "Severgroup" of Alexey Mordashov, for 20 billion roubles.

References

External links 
 Lenta Homepage

Retail companies of Russia
Companies based in Saint Petersburg
Retail companies established in 1993
Russian brands
Companies listed on the Moscow Exchange
Companies listed on the London Stock Exchange